Riyadh is the capital of Saudi Arabia.

Riyadh or Al-Riyadh may also refer to:

Places

Saudi Arabia
Riyadh Province, a province of Saudi Arabia
Riyad Bank, a Saudi bank

Egypt
El Reyad, a city in the Kafr El Sheikh Governorate

Mauritania
Riyad, Mauritania is a suburb of Nouakchott.

Tunisia
Riyadh (Tunisia), a city in one of the Tunisian islands

People
 Riad (name), people with the name

Sports
Al-Riyadh SC, a football club in Riyadh, Saudi Arabia
 Al Riyadi Amman, Jordanian professional basketball club
 Al Riyadi Club Beirut, multi-sports club based in Manara, Beirut, Lebanon

Other uses
Al-Riyadh SC (Iraq), a football club in Kirkuk, Iraq
 Al Riyadh class frigate, class of ships in the Saudi navy
Al Riyadh (newspaper), a Saudi newspaper